"Hopeless Romantic" is a song by American rapper Wiz Khalifa featuring singer Swae Lee of Rae Sremmurd, for his sixth studio album Rolling Papers 2 (2018).
It was released to urban contemporary radio on August 7, 2018, by Atlantic Records as the album's second radio single. It was produced by Young Chop & CBMix.

Music video
The official music video debuted August 13, 2018, and received 3,000,000 views its first week of availability. As of May 2021, the video has over 80 million views.

Live performances
Wiz and Swae Lee performed "Hopeless Romantic" on The Tonight Show on July 19, 2018.

Charts

Certifications

Release history

References

2018 singles
2018 songs
Atlantic Records singles
Songs written by Swae Lee
Songs written by Wiz Khalifa
Swae Lee songs
Wiz Khalifa songs
Songs written by Young Chop